Jacob Carl Green (born January 21, 1957) is a former American football defensive end. He played college football for Texas A&M.

Green was an All-American selection in 1979 after compiling 134 tackles and was a then school-record 20 quarterback sacks. Green’s 37 career sacks still rank second in A&M history behind Aaron Wallace’s 42 career sacks. Green owns school records for career fumbles caused (12) and season fumbles caused (six in 1978).

Green was a first-round draft pick (10th overall) in the 1980 NFL draft by the Seattle Seahawks. In his 13-year National Football League career, Green played 12 seasons for the Seattle Seahawks, as number 79, and one season for the San Francisco 49ers. Green recorded 97.5 career sacks for the Seahawks (unofficially 116; sacks became an official NFL statistic in 1982, Green's third season), a team record and at the time of his retirement good for number three on the all-time sacks leaderboard behind only Reggie White and Lawrence Taylor.

References

External links

Green on Seahawk page

1957 births
Living people
American football defensive ends
People from Houston
Players of American football from Texas
African-American players of American football
San Francisco 49ers players
Seattle Seahawks players
American Conference Pro Bowl players
Texas A&M Aggies football players
21st-century African-American people
20th-century African-American sportspeople